North Dakota Highway 20 (ND 20) is a  north–south highway in North Dakota. It runs from U.S. Route 52 (US 52) and US 281 in Jamestown to the Canada–United States border near Sarles. The highway continues into Manitoba as PTH 34.

A portion of ND 20 between mile markers 87 and 90 was closed in April 2010 due to flooding at Devils Lake and Spring Lake.

Route description

Major intersections

See also

 List of state highways in North Dakota
 List of highways numbered 20

References

External links

 The North Dakota Highways Page by Chris Geelhart
 North Dakota Signs by Mark O'Neil

020
Jamestown, North Dakota
Transportation in Stutsman County, North Dakota
Transportation in Foster County, North Dakota
Transportation in Eddy County, North Dakota
Transportation in Benson County, North Dakota
Transportation in Ramsey County, North Dakota
Transportation in Cavalier County, North Dakota